Kolstad Church is a parish church of the Church of Norway in the municipality of Trondheim in Trøndelag county, Norway. It is the church for the Kolstad parish which is part of the Heimdal og Byåsen prosti (deanery) in the Diocese of Nidaros. The modern, concrete church was built in a rectangular design in 1986 using plans drawn up by the architect Nils Henrik Eggen. The church seats about 460 people.

History
The white, concrete building was built from 1985 to 1986 by the lead contractor Ole Stjern. The new building was consecrated on 4 May 1986 by Bishop Kristen Kyrre Bremer. The altarpiece (from 1989) is made by Sigmund Lystrup out of old beams from the old Grunge Church in Vinje in Telemark.

See also
List of churches in Nidaros

References

Churches in Trondheim
Churches in Trøndelag
Rectangular churches in Norway
Concrete churches in Norway
20th-century Church of Norway church buildings
Churches completed in 1986
1986 establishments in Norway